In quantum mechanics, a probability amplitude is a complex number used for describing the behaviour of systems. The modulus squared of this quantity represents a probability density.

Probability amplitudes provide a relationship between the quantum state vector of a system and the results of observations of that system, a link was first proposed by Max Born, in 1926. Interpretation of values of a wave function as the probability amplitude is a pillar of the Copenhagen interpretation of quantum mechanics. In fact, the properties of the space of wave functions were being used to make physical predictions (such as emissions from atoms being at certain discrete energies) before any physical interpretation of a particular function was offered. Born was awarded half of the 1954 Nobel Prize in Physics for this understanding, and the probability thus calculated is sometimes called the "Born probability". These probabilistic concepts, namely the probability density and quantum measurements, were vigorously contested at the time by the original physicists working on the theory, such as Schrödinger and Einstein. It is the source of the mysterious consequences and philosophical difficulties in the interpretations of quantum mechanics—topics that continue to be debated even today.

Overview

Physical
Neglecting some technical complexities, the problem of quantum measurement is the behaviour of a quantum state, for which the value of the observable  to be measured is uncertain. Such a state is thought to be a coherent superposition of the observable's eigenstates, states on which the value of the observable is uniquely defined, for different possible values of the observable.

The system may always be described by a linear combination or superposition of these eigenstates with unequal "weights". Intuitively it is clear that eigenstates with heavier "weights" are more "likely" to be produced. Indeed, which of the above eigenstates the system jumps to is given by a probabilistic law: the probability of the system jumping to the state is proportional to the absolute value of the corresponding numerical weight squared. These numerical weights are called probability amplitudes, and this relationship used to calculate probabilities from given pure quantum states (such as wave functions) is called the Born rule.

Clearly, the sum of the probabilities, which equals the sum of the absolute squares of the probability amplitudes, must equal 1. This is the normalization (see below) requirement.

In other words the probability amplitudes are zero for all the other eigenstates, and remain zero for the future measurements. The probability amplitudes are unaffected by either measurement, and the observables are said to commute.

A second, subsequent observation of  no longer certainly produces the eigenvalue corresponding to the starting state.

Mathematical

In a formal setup, any system in quantum mechanics is described by a state, which is a vector , residing in an abstract complex vector space, called a Hilbert space. It may be either infinite- or finite-dimensional. A usual presentation of that Hilbert space is a special function space, called , on certain set , that is either some configuration space or a discrete set.

For a measurable function , the condition  specifies that a finitely bounded integral must apply:

In this basis  specifies the coordinate presentation of an abstract vector .

Mathematically, many  presentations of the system's Hilbert space can exist. We shall consider not an arbitrary one, but a  one for the observable  in question. In other words,  shall be diagonal in that basis. Then  is the "probability amplitude" for the eigenstate .

Wave functions and probabilities
If the configuration space  is continuous (something like the real line or Euclidean space, see above), then there are no valid quantum states corresponding to particular , and the probability that the system is "in the state " will always be zero. An archetypical example of this is the  space constructed with 1-dimensional Lebesgue measure; it is used to study a motion in one dimension. This presentation of the infinite-dimensional Hilbert space corresponds to the spectral decomposition of the coordinate operator:  in this example.

Generally, it is the case when the motion of a particle is described in the position space, where the corresponding probability amplitude function  is the wave function.

It gives to both amplitude and density function a physical dimension, unlike a dimensionless probability. For example, for a 3-dimensional wave function, the amplitude has the dimension [L−3/2], where L is length.

Discrete amplitudes

These are sometimes referred to as wave functions of a discrete variable . Discrete dynamical variables are used in such problems as a particle in an idealized reflective box and quantum harmonic oscillator.
In this case, if the vector  has the norm 1, then  is just the probability that the quantum system resides in the state .

A discrete probability amplitude may be considered as a fundamental frequency in the Probability Frequency domain (spherical harmonics) for the purposes of simplifying M-theory transformation calculations.

Examples 
Take the simplest meaningful example of the discrete case: a quantum system that can be in two possible states: for example, the polarization of a photon. When the polarization is measured, it could be the horizontal state  or the vertical state . Until its polarization is measured the photon can be in a superposition of both these states, so its state  could be written as:

When the photon's polarization is measured, the resulting state is either horizontal or vertical.

The order of such results, is, however, completely random.

Another meaningful example is quantum spin. If a spin-measuring apparatus is pointing along the z-axis and is therefore able to measure the z-component of the spin, the following must be true for the measurement of spin "up" and "down":

Which agrees with experiment.

Normalization

This leads to a constraint that ; more generally the sum of the squared moduli of the probability amplitudes of all the possible states is equal to one. If to understand "all the possible states" as an orthonormal basis, that makes sense in the discrete case, then this condition is the same as the norm-1 condition explained above.

One can always divide any non-zero element of a Hilbert space by its norm and obtain a normalized state vector. Not every wave function belongs to the Hilbert space , though. Wave functions that fulfill this constraint are called normalizable.

The Schrödinger wave equation, describing states of quantum particles, has solutions that describe a system and determine precisely how the state changes with time. Suppose a wavefunction  is a solution of the wave equation, giving a description of the particle (position , for time ).  If the wavefunction is square integrable, i.e.

Under the standard Copenhagen interpretation, the normalized wavefunction gives probability amplitudes for the position of the particle. Hence, at a given time ,  is the probability density function of the particle's position.

Note that if any solution  to the wave equation is normalisable at some time , then the  defined above is always normalised, so that

is always a probability density function for all . This is key to understanding the importance of this interpretation, because for a given the particle's constant mass, initial  and the potential, the Schrödinger equation fully determines subsequent wavefunction, and the above then gives probabilities of locations of the particle at all subsequent times.

The laws of calculating probabilities of events
A. Provided a system evolves naturally (which under the Copenhagen interpretation means that the system is not subjected to measurement), the following laws apply:

The probability (or the density of probability in position/momentum space) of an event to occur is the square of the absolute value of the probability amplitude for the event: .
If there are several mutually exclusive, indistinguishable alternatives in which an event might occur (or, in realistic interpretations of wavefunction, several wavefunctions exist for a space-time event), the probability amplitudes of all these possibilities add to give the probability amplitude for that event: 
If, for any alternative, there is a succession of sub-events, then the probability amplitude for that alternative is the product of the probability amplitude for each sub-event: .
Non-entangled states of a composite quantum system have amplitudes equal to the product of the amplitudes of the states of constituent systems:  See  for more information.
Law 2 is analogous to the addition law of probability, only the probability being substituted by the probability amplitude. Similarly, Law 4 is analogous to the multiplication law of probability for independent events; note that it fails for entangled states.

B. When an experiment is performed to decide between the several alternatives, the same laws hold true for the corresponding probabilities: 

Provided one knows the probability amplitudes for events associated with an experiment, the above laws provide a complete description of quantum systems in terms of probabilities.

The above laws give way to the path integral formulation of quantum mechanics, in the formalism developed by the celebrated theoretical physicist Richard Feynman. This approach to quantum mechanics forms the stepping-stone to the path integral approach to quantum field theory.

In the context of the double-slit experiment

Probability amplitudes have special significance because they act in quantum mechanics as the equivalent of conventional probabilities, with many analogous laws, as described above. For example, in the classic double-slit experiment, electrons are fired randomly at two slits, and the probability distribution of detecting electrons at all parts on a large screen placed behind the slits, is questioned. An intuitive answer is that , where  is the probability of that event. This is obvious if one assumes that an electron passes through either slit. When nature does not have a way to distinguish which slit the electron has gone through (a much more stringent condition than simply "it is not observed"), the observed probability distribution on the screen reflects the interference pattern that is common with light waves. If one assumes the above law to be true, then this pattern cannot be explained. The particles cannot be said to go through either slit and the simple explanation does not work. The correct explanation is, however, by the association of probability amplitudes to each event. This is an example of the case A as described in the previous article. The complex amplitudes which represent the electron passing each slit ( and ) follow the law of precisely the form expected: . This is the principle of quantum superposition. The probability, which is the modulus squared of the probability amplitude, then, follows the interference pattern under the requirement that amplitudes are complex:

Here,  and 
A purely real formulation has too few dimensions to describe the system's state when superposition is taken into account. That is, without the arguments of the amplitudes, we cannot describe the phase-dependent interference. The crucial term  is called the "interference term", and this would be missing if we had added the probabilities.

However, one may choose to devise an experiment in which the experimenter observes which slit each electron goes through. Then case B of the above article applies, and the interference pattern is not observed on the screen.

One may go further in devising an experiment in which the experimenter gets rid of this "which-path information" by a "quantum eraser". Then, according to the Copenhagen interpretation, the case A applies again and the interference pattern is restored.

Conservation of probabilities and the continuity equation

Intuitively, since a normalised wave function stays normalised while evolving according to the wave equation, there will be a relationship between the change in the probability density of the particle's position and the change in the amplitude at these positions.

Define the probability current (or flux)  as

measured in units of (probability)/(area × time).

Then the current satisfies the equation

The best example is in classical electrodynamics, where  corresponds to current density corresponding to electric charge, and the density is the charge-density. The corresponding continuity equation describes the local conservation of charges.

Composite systems
product of respective probability measures. In other words, amplitudes of a non-entangled composite state are products of original amplitudes, and respective observables on the systems 1 and 2 behave on these states as independent random variables. This strengthens the probabilistic interpretation explicated above.

Amplitudes in operators
The concept of amplitudes described above is relevant to quantum state vectors. It is also used in the context of unitary operators that are important in the scattering theory, notably in the form of S-matrices. Whereas moduli of vector components squared, for a given vector, give a fixed probability distribution, moduli of matrix elements squared are interpreted as transition probabilities just as in a random process. Like a finite-dimensional unit vector specifies a finite probability distribution, a finite-dimensional unitary matrix specifies transition probabilities between a finite number of states. Note that columns of a unitary matrix, as vectors, have the norm 1.

The "transitional" interpretation may be applied to s on non-discrete spaces as well.

See also
Free particle
Finite potential barrier
Matter wave
Uncertainty principle
Ward's probability amplitude
Wave packet
Phase space formulation

Footnotes

References

Quantum measurement
Physical quantities
Particle statistics